Benjamin Becker was the defending champion but chose to compete in Monte Carlo instead.Kevin Anderson won in the final 6–7(7), 7–6(7), 6–1 against Tobias Kamke.

Seeds

Draw

Finals

Top half

Bottom half

References
Main Draw
Qualifying Singles

2010 ATP Challenger Tour
2010,Singles